Strongylognathus italicus is a species of ant in the genus Strongylognathus. It is endemic to Italy.

References

Hymenoptera of Europe
Strongylognathus
Insects described in 1924
Endemic fauna of Italy
Taxonomy articles created by Polbot
https://www.antwiki.org/wiki/Strongylognathus_italicus